The 2017 Georgia Tech Yellow Jackets football team represented the Georgia Institute of Technology during the 2017 NCAA Division I FBS football season. The Yellow Jackets were led by tenth-year head coach Paul Johnson and played their home games at Bobby Dodd Stadium. They competed as a member of the Coastal Division in the Atlantic Coast Conference. They finished the season 5–6, 4–4 in ACC play to finish in third place in the Coastal Division.

Previous season 
Georgia Tech ended the 2016 season with a 9-4 overall record, 4–4 in the ACC.  The Yellow Jackets ended the season winning six of their last seven games, defeating arch-rival Georgia in Athens by a score of 28–27, and finishing the season with a 33–18 win in the TaxSlayer Bowl over Kentucky.

Schedule

Game summaries

vs Tennessee 

Georgia Tech controlled the clock and dominated most of the game yardage wise, but gave up a key score in the final minutes of the 4th quarter. Georgia Tech had 2 missed field goal attempts that sent the game to overtime. During the second overtime, Coach Paul Johnson opted to try for a 2-point conversion to win the game there instead of kicking a point after try to tie the game and continue overtime play. Tennessee's defense came up with the stop and the Volunteers held on to the 1 point victory.

Jacksonville State 

Georgia Tech had a poor offensive performance during the first half. Their only score was a touchdown after an interception gave the offense a short field. After some half time adjustments, Tech came storming out and put up 27 unanswered points to win the game.

at UCF 

The game was canceled due to the cleanup for Hurricane Irma.

Pittsburgh 

Coach Pat Narduzzi of Pittsburgh a few days prior to the game criticized Georgia Tech's use of cut blocks during their offensive possessions calling them "dangerous." After Georgia Tech's win, Coach Paul Johnson criticized the Yellow Jacket offense for causing 4 turnovers and said they would not have won had they played a good team as what was described as a "snide" response to Narduzzi.

North Carolina 

Georgia Tech received the opening kickoff and traded a few short drives with the Tar Heels before scoring on an 18-play drive. From then on, the Jackets dominated on both sides of the ball against a severely injured UNC team by using time of possession to their advantage and smothering the UNC offense. The Tar Heels scored late in the 4th quarter, against Tech's backup defenders, to end a 5-quarter shutout streak. Both TaQuon Marshall and Kirvonte Benson tallied over 130 yards rushing each on the day. This was Tech's first win against UNC in 4 years.

at Miami (FL) 

Tech led most of the game until the 4th quarter when Miami kept its chances alive with a long pass and miraculous catch. Miami would eventually kick the game winning field goal giving the Jackets their 2nd loss of the season.

Wake Forest

at Clemson

at Virginia

Virginia Tech

at Duke

Georgia 

Despite coming within a touchdown near the end of the first half, Georgia Tech would go on to lose as Georgia would score 24 unanswered points in their way to a victory. Tech was officially disqualified from bowl eligibility with the loss causing their final record to be one win shy of qualifying.

Rankings

Coaching staff

References

Georgia Tech
Georgia Tech Yellow Jackets football seasons
Georgia Tech Yellow Jackets football